Petr Jákl Jr. (born 14 September 1973) is a Czech actor, director, producer, former stuntman and a judo fighter. His father Petr Jákl Sr, is an Olympic judo fighter, stuntman and producer.

Judo achievements

Filmography

As actor 
Film
 1999 Nebát se a nakrást
 2001 Jak ukrást Dagmaru
 2002 Bad Company as Darius
 2002 XXX as Kolya
 2003 Men of Action (Short) as Action Star
 2003 Krysar as Pied Piper
 2004 Eurotrip as Gunter
 2004 Alien vs. Predator as Stone
 2005 Pterodactyl as Tezo
 2005 Born Into Shit as Mr. Hrana
 2008 Bathory as Bald Hunchback
 2010 Kajinek
 2013 Revival

Video Games 
2018 Kingdom Come: Deliverance as Runt (visual representation only)

As director 
 2010 Kajínek - Action drama film
 2015 Ghoul - Horror film
 2022 Medieval - Action historical drama

References

External links
sports-reference.com 

1973 births
Living people
Czech male film actors
Czech film directors
Czech male judoka
Judoka at the 2000 Summer Olympics
Olympic judoka of the Czech Republic
Sportspeople from Prague